Stark is an unincorporated community in Pike County, in the U.S. state of Missouri.

History
A post office called Stark was established in 1888, and remained in operation until 1907. The community has the name of Thomas Thornton Stark, the original owner of the town site.

References

Unincorporated communities in Pike County, Missouri
Unincorporated communities in Missouri